Out on a Limb may refer to:

 Risk-taking
 Out on a Limb (book), 1983 autobiography by Shirley MacLaine

Film and TV
 Out on a Limb (1950 film), animation starring Chip 'n' Dale and Donald Duck
 Out on a Limb (1992 film), American comedy
 Out on a Limb, 2005 film starring Neil Stuke
 Out on a Limb (TV miniseries), 1987 American miniseries based on the book by, and starring, Shirley MacLaine
 "Out on a Limb", an episode of the Internet series Happy Tree Friends (2003-5)
 "Out on a Limb" (Arrested Development), 2005 season 2 episode of Arrested Development
 "Out on a Limb", ER season 12 (2006) episode

Music
 Out on a Limb Records, Irish independent record label started in 2003
 Out on a Limb, 1995 album by Rena Gaile
 Out on a Limb, 2010 album by Janet Panic
Out on a Limb (album), 1956 album by Pete Rugolo and His All-stars
 Out on a Limb with Clark Terry, 1958 album by Clark Terry
 "Out on a Limb", a song by Teena Marie from the 1984 album Starchild

See also
 Chance (disambiguation)